Hermann Roeren (29 March 1844 – 23 December 1920) was a German lawyer and member of the Reichstag.

Roeren was born in Rüthen, Westphalia, and died, aged 76, in Cologne (Köln-Lindenthal).

Sources
http://www.reichstag-abgeordnetendatenbank.de/selectmaske.html?pnd=116593067&recherche=ja

1844 births
1920 deaths
People from Soest (district)
People from the Province of Westphalia
German Roman Catholics
Centre Party (Germany) politicians
Members of the 9th Reichstag of the German Empire
Members of the 10th Reichstag of the German Empire
Members of the 11th Reichstag of the German Empire
Members of the 12th Reichstag of the German Empire
Members of the 13th Reichstag of the German Empire